Liling is a county-level city and the 12th most populous county-level division in Hunan Province, China; it is under the administration of the prefecture-level city of Zhuzhou. Located on the middle eastern margin of the province, the city is bordered to the north by Liuyang City, to the west by Lusong District and Zhuzhou County, to the south by You County, to the east by Xiangdong District of Yichun, Shangli County of Jiangxi.

Liling is known for its traditional porcelain and firework industries. The "Chairman Mao" porcelain produced in Liling is used as gifts for presidents.

Liling has extensive transport links, such as G60 (Hukun highway), S11 (Yueru Highway), 320, and 106 national roads. Also, there is the Liling Hukun High speed train station and Liling train station, which mainly serves trains going east and west across China as well as local trains in Hunan.

Liling has had a booming economy since the beginning of the 21st century. In 2010, Liling had a GDP of 26.37 billion.

Administrative divisions
According to the result on adjustment of township-level administrative divisions of Liling on November 26, 2015, the divisions of Liling, according to the result on adjustment of township-level administrative divisions of Liling on November 26, 2015: Qingshuijiang Township merged to Chuanwan Town, Hejiaqiao Town and Dazhang Town merged to Mingyue Town. Shenfugang Town and Lishanba Town merged to Chashan Town. Xinyang Township and Xianxia Town merged to Zuoquan Town. Fenglinshi Township and Huangtazui Town merged to Fenglin Town. Fuli Town and Nanqiao Town merged to Litian Town. Wangfang Town was revoked. Liling has four subdistricts and 19 towns under its jurisdiction.

Geography
Liling is situated in the east of Hunan province. It is bordered by Pingxiang and Shangli County to the east, Liuyang to the north, Zhuzhou to the west, You County to the south.

Rivers
Major rivers of Liliang are Lu River, Chengjiang River, Jiubu River, Zhaoling River and Jiang River.

Lakes and reservoirs
Guanzhuang Reservoir is the largest body of water and the largest reservoir in Liling.

Other reservoirs include Hetian Reservoir, Xuefeng Reservoir, Wangxianqiao Reservoir, Zhoufang Reservoir and Outang Reservoir.

Mountains

Climate

Economy
Liling is one of the most developed county-level cities in Hunan, it ranked the 60th in the Top100 of counties and county-level cities of China by comprehensive strength in 2020. Liling has the six-largest economy in the Hunan. The largest sectors of the city's economy are fireworks and porcelain manufacturing. 
As of 2016, the gross domestic product of Liling was CN￥ 58.08 billion. The primary sector, including agriculture, fishing, forestry and mining, accounted for 9% of the county's GDP. Secondary industries, including manufacturering, construction, transport and communications, made up 28% of GDP. And the tertiary sector of trade, finance, services and public administration, accounted for nearly 63% of GDP.

Demographics

Population
As of the end of 2016, the National Bureau of Statistics of the People's Republic of China estimates the city's population now to be 1,060,000.

Language
Mandarin is the official language. The local people speak both Xiang dialect and Liling dialect.

Religion
As of 2016, most of Liling people are atheists. They worship Chinese folk religion. Only 1% of Liling people belong to Buddhists, 1% are Taoists, 1% are Roman Catholics and Protestants.

Education
As of 2016, Liling has 213 primary schools, 44 middle schools, nine high schools, one special education school and 309 kindergartens.

Transportation

Railway
Shanghai–Kunming railway and Shanghai–Kunming high-speed railway, which connect Shanghai and Kunming, run north–south through the towns and subdistrict of Litian, Baitutan, Pukou, Wangxian, Xianyueshan, Dongfu, Sunjiawan, Sifen, and Chuanwan.

Liling–Chaling railway and Liling-Yongzhou railway run north–south through the city.

Expressway
 G60 Shanghai–Kunming Expressway
 Yueru Expressway
 Litan Expressway
 Lianzhu Expressway 
 Louli Expressway

National Highway
 G106 National Highway 
 G320 National Highway

Tourism
Guanzhuang, Lu River Bridge, Geng Chuan Ancestral Temple, Lujiang Academy, Former Residence of Li Lisan, Former Residence of Chen Mingren, and Xianshan Park are popular attractions in Liling.

Changqing Temple, Yunyang Temple and Dongfu Temple are well known Buddhist temples.

Notable people

 Li Tian
 Cai Shenxi, a general officer in the Chinese Workers' and Peasants' Red Army during the Chinese Civil War. 
 Chen Mingren, a general in the People's Liberation Army.
 Cheng Qian, governor of Hunan.
 Cheng Xingling, politician. 
 Geng Biao, Minister of Defense of the People's Republic of China.
 He Jian (Ho Chien), a native of Liling, was Nanjing's governor of Hunan during the time of the Kuomintang.  He killed more than 20,000 peasants, students, and workers between April and June, 1927.
 Li Lisan, an early leader of the Chinese communists, and the top leader of the Chinese Communist Party from 1928 to 1930, member of the Politburo, and later a member of the Central Committee.
 Peng Daoru, electronics expert.
 Song Shilun, a general in the People's Liberation Army.
 Tang Fei-fan, a medical microbiologist best known for culturing the Chlamydia trachomatis agent in the yolk sacs of eggs.
 Yang Dezhi, a general in the People's Liberation Army.
 Yang Mingzhu, mathematician.
 Zhang Yousong, translator.
 Zhang Zemin, scientist.
 Zuo Quan, a military officer in the Eighth Route Army.

References

Bibliography
 

 
Cities in Hunan
Zhuzhou